Amegilla is a large genus of bees in the tribe Anthophorini. Several species have blue metallic bands on the abdomen, and are referred to as "blue-banded bees" and "digger bees". One of their names in english, "digger bees" is given to them because they dig up a hole in dry ground and make it their nest.

The genus occurs all around the world but very few live above 45° North. Amegilla are associated with arid and subarid biomes, matorrals, steppes, sub-deserts and deserts.

All of Amegilla are solitary species. They are also very fast, agid flyers, and because of this, some taxa are close to imposible to catch.

Selected species
 Amegilla albiceps (Rayment, 1951)
 Amegilla bombiformis (Smith, 1854)
 Amegilla calens (Lepeletier, 1841)
 Amegilla canifrons (Smith, 1854)
 Amegilla confusa  (Smith, 1854)
 Amegilla dawsoni (Rayment, 1951)
 Amegilla quadrifasciata (Villers, 1789)
 Amegilla violacea (Lepeletier, 1841)
 Amegilla mucorea (Klug, 1845)
 Amegilla fallax (Smith, 1879)
 Amegilla subcoerulea (Lepeletier, 1841)
 Amegilla cingulata (Fabricius, 1775)
 Amegilla cingulifera (Cockerell, 1910)
 Amegilla comberi (Cockerell, 1911)
 Amegilla niveocincta (Smith, 1854)
 Amegilla asserta (Cockerell, 1926)
 Amegilla puttalama (Strand, 1913)
 Amegilla quadrifasciata (de Villers, 1789)
 Amegilla subinsularis (Strand) Cockerell, 1919
 Amegilla zonata (Linnaeus, 1758 )

See also
 Josephine Cardale, an Amegilla researcher

References

 Pierre Rasmont, Bees of Europe (2019)
 
 ITIS: Genus Amegilla

Apinae
Bee genera